Oscar Chelimo (born 12 December 2001) is a Ugandan long-distance runner. He won the bronze medal for the 5000 metres at the 2022 World Athletics Championships.

His older brother, Jacob Kiplimo is also an elite long-distance runner.

Career
In 2018, Oscar Chelimo finished in seventh place in the men's 5000 metres event at the World U20 Championships held in Tampere, Finland. He also competed in the boys' 3000 metres at the Youth Olympics in Buenos Aires, Argentina and won the bronze medal.

He represented Uganda at the 2019 African Games held in Rabat, Morocco, running in the men's 5000 m event to finish in fifth place. That same year, he also competed in the men's 5000 m event at the 2019 World Athletics Championships held in Doha, Qatar, though he did not qualify to compete in the final.

In 2020, he won the men's 5 kilometres road race at the BOclassic held in Bolzano, Italy.

On 12 May 2021, Chelimo raced the 5000 m in Bergamo, Italy, finishing third in 13:06.79, an Olympic qualifying time. Next he raced at the 60th Ostrava Golden Spike in the 3000 m, where he placed third in 7:43.00. He finished 16th in the 5000 m at the postponed 2020 Tokyo Olympics in August.

Chelimo won the bronze medal for the 5000 m at the 2022 World Athletics Championships held in Eugene, Oregon in July, and took his second victory at the BOclassic on the New Year's Eve that year (10 km).

Achievements

International competitions

Personal bests
 1500 metres – 3:47.48 (Milan 2019)
 3000 metres – 7:43.00 (Ostrava 2021)
 5000 metres – 13:00.42 (Brussels 2022)
Road
 5 kilometres – 13:17 (Bolzano 2020)
 10 kilometres – 28:06 (Arezzo 2021)

References

External links
 

Living people
2001 births
Place of birth missing (living people)
Ugandan male long-distance runners
Ugandan male cross country runners
World Athletics Championships athletes for Uganda
Athletes (track and field) at the 2018 Summer Youth Olympics
Athletes (track and field) at the 2019 African Games
Athletes (track and field) at the 2018 African Youth Games
African Games competitors for Uganda
Athletes (track and field) at the 2020 Summer Olympics
Olympic athletes of Uganda
21st-century Ugandan people
Ugandan expatriates in Italy